Bob Isbister Jr. was an all-star and Grey Cup champion Canadian football player, playing from 1937 to 1943. He was the son of Canadian football hall-of-famer Bob Isbister.

A graduate of the University of Toronto and a star with the Varsity Blues, Isbister joined the Toronto Argonauts for a brief but successful football career. Playing only 11 regular season games and 6 playoff games for the Boatmen, he won two Grey Cup championships and was twice an all-star. He was transferred by his employer to Hamilton in 1939, where he joined his father's team, the Hamilton Tigers, and was once again an all-star selection.

Isbister joined the RCN during World War II and played two final seasons with the Halifax Navy squad.

References 

Sportspeople from Hamilton, Ontario
Players of Canadian football from Ontario
Toronto Varsity Blues football players
Toronto Argonauts players
Hamilton Tigers football players
Royal Canadian Navy personnel of World War II